Maureen Staal (born 30 September 1982) is a volleyball player from the Netherlands.

Career 
She was a member of the Dutch National Women's Team.
She participated at the 2002 FIVB Volleyball Women's World Championship.

Clubs
2001 - 2003 VVC Vught

References

External links
 profile at CEV
http://www.fivb.org/En/Volleyball/Competitions/WorldChampionships/Women/2002/Photos/PhotoGallery.asp?No=077&Title=Netherlands-Brazil
http://todor66.com/volleyball/World/Women_2002.html

1982 births
Living people
Dutch women's volleyball players
People from Vught
Wing spikers